Vasantasena is a 1941 Indian Kannada-language film directed by Ramayyar Shirur. It stars Lakshmi Bai, Subbayya Naidu and Nagendra Rao in lead roles. The film is based on the Sanskrit play, Mṛcchakatika by Śūdraka.

Cast 
 Lakshmi Bai as Vasantasena
 Subbaiah Naidu as Charudatta
 R. Nagendra Rao as Sakara
 S. K. Padmadevi as Madanika
 Chandramma as Dhoota Devi
 Sarojamma as Radhanika
 Sundaramma
 Baby Vinoda as Rohasena
 G. V. Krishnamurthy Rao as Maitreya
 G. R. Sandow as Kotwal

Soundtrack 
The music of the film was composed by P Kalinga Rao, Saraswathi Stores Orchestra, H R Padmanabha Shashtri, B.Devendrappa with lyrics for the soundtracks penned by Ramakrishna Sastry and R Nagendra Rao.

References

External links 
 
 
 VasantaSena on Chiloka

1941 films
1940s Kannada-language films
Indian black-and-white films
Indian films based on plays
Films about courtesans in India